St. Aidan's Church, Basford is a parish church in the Church of England Diocese of Southwell in Basford, Nottingham.

History

The church was built in 1905 by Robert Evans and Sons, as a chapel of ease to St. Leodegarius Church, Basford.

It was consecrated on 21 February 1905 by the Bishop of Southwell Edwyn Hoskyns.

The church is famous for its 1966 carvings at the top of the pillars by the sculptor Witold Gracjan Kawalec, representing Work, Peace, Mercy, Hope, Life, Guidance, Humility, Justice, Grace and Music.

Incumbents
W. A. Boyd 1905-1909
F. Kennen 1909-1921
G. H. Vine 1921-1960
Kenneth Cook 1961-1967
R. Fearn 1968-1973
H. J. Crowie 1975-1978
G. Hepple 1979-1984
W. Jarvis 1984-1993
J. Hemstock and P. Hemstock 1994-1997
P. Hemstock 1997-2006
Richard Shaw 2007-2016

Services and events
Sunday
10.00am  Eucharist - 1st, 2nd & 4th Sundays of the month
10.00am  Service of the Word - 3rd Sunday of the month
6.30pm  Eucharist - 3rd Sunday of the month only
Thursday   11.00am Luncheon Fellowship
                 Drop in for a snack and a chat ~ all welcome

Friday       9.00am Coffee Morning
                  Held Friday morning between 9.00 a.m. and noon it's an informal chance to meet with friends
                  and chat over biscuits and a cup of tea or coffee. A warm welcome awaits everyone.

                  If you have little ones, we hope they enjoy the toys. There's no charge.
                  Term time only

'''How to find us'

By Car

St Aidan's is located at the Junction of Arnold Road & Landsdowne Road.
We’ve a small car park to the rear of church accessed off Lansdowne Road,
there's also plenty of free on street parking.
NG5 3JH

By Tram

David Lane Tram Stop
Cross the railway level crossing walk up Southwark Street St Aidan's is 300m   up the hill on the right.

By Bus

Nottingham City Transport

Services 68, 68a, 69, 69a and 80 – Basford Crossings bus stop 
Walk up Southwark Street opposite Basford railway level crossing
St Aidan's is 300m up the hill on the right.

Service L14  - Wilton Street bus stop 25m

Contact information
Church Office 0115 924 5437

References

Sources
Southwell Diocesan Website

Church of England church buildings in Nottinghamshire
Churches in Nottingham